The Island That All Flow By (also known as The Island of River Flow) is a 2016 Taiwanese television film. It stars Ivy Yin, Cheng Jen-shuo and Andrew Chen. Filming began on January 18, 2016. The film premiered on CTV and CTi Entertainment on April 29, 2016.

Synopsis 
The film depicts the story between toll station worker Lin Chia-wen (Ivy Yin) and truck driver Wang Chih-hao (Cheng Jen-shuo). As Lin faces losing her job and her rebellious son Fu Yen-chao (Andrew Chen), how would she deal with all the problems?

Cast

Filming locations 
 Banqiao District
  Xin Min Street
  Shidiao Park
  Xin Min Street Police Dormitory
 Taichung City
  The former Da Jia Toll Station

Awards and nominations

References

External links

2016 television films
2016 films
2016 drama films
Taiwanese drama films
Taiwanese television films